Malaysia competed in the 1974 British Commonwealth Games held in Christchurch, New Zealand from 24 January to 2 February 1974.

Medal summary

Medals by sport

Medallists

Athletics

Men
Track event

Women
Field event

Key
Note–Ranks given for track events are within the athlete's heat only
Q = Qualified for the next round
q = Qualified for the next round as a fastest loser or, in field events, by position without achieving the qualifying target
NR = National record
N/A = Round not applicable for the event
Bye = Athlete not required to compete in round

Badminton

Cycling

Track
Sprint

Time trial

Scratch race

Shooting

Men

Swimming

Men

Women

Weightlifting

Men

References

Malaysia at the Commonwealth Games
Nations at the 1974 British Commonwealth Games
1974 in Malaysian sport